The Ministry of Foreign Affairs of Turkmenistan (Türkmenistanyň Daşary Işler Ministirligi, DIM) is the central government institution charged with leading the foreign policy of Turkmenistan. It was established in 1991. The current Foreign Minister is Raşit Meredow.

Organization 
In accordance with the law under the jurisdiction of the President of Turkmenistan. Structure and number of employees of the central apparatus of Turkmenistan, as well as diplomatic missions and consular offices of Turkmenistan abroad approved by the president of Turkmenistan.

The structure of the ministry consists of 17 units - 15 divisions, one control and the magazine "Foreign Policy and Diplomacy of Turkmenistan". Tasks, functions and procedures of the structural subdivisions of the central apparatus of the ministry governed by appropriate provisions.

Office 
On April 1, 2011, a new building of the ministry was commissioned in Ashgabat. It has the original architecture, the 14-story skyscraper surmounted by a giant globe, which houses rooms for press conferences. In the building there are 118 workers offices and meeting rooms, an auditorium, conference room, and a lounge for international conferences. On the 11th floor there is a viewing terrace with panoramic views of Ashgabat. The building was erected on the Archabil Avenue, which also has offices of other ministries and departments. The building was built by French company Bouygues.

Ministers of Foreign Affairs 

Awdy Kulyýew 1990–92
Halykberdy Atayew 1992–95
Boris Şyhmyradow 1995–2000
Batyr Berdiýew 2000–2001
Raşit Meredow 2001–present

See also
Foreign relations of Turkmenistan
Institute of International Relations (Turkmenistan)

References

External links
 

Foreign Affairs, Ministry of
Foreign Affairs, Ministry of
Turkmenistan
Ashgabat